Manouria is a genus of tortoises in the family Testudinidae. The genus was erected by John Edward Gray in 1854.

Species
The following five species are recognized as being valid, two of which are extant, and three of which are extinct:
Manouria emys  – Asian forest tortoise
Manouria impressa  – impressed tortoise
†Manouria sondaari  – a giant land tortoise from Luzon Island, Philippines however, Rhodin et al. (2015) transferred this species to the genus Megalochelys.
†Manouria punjabiensis  – a fossil tortoise from Siwaliks, India
†Manouria oyamai  – a fossil tortoise from Ryukyu Islands, Japan

Nota bene: A binomial authority in parentheses indicates that the species was originally described in a genus other than Manouria.

References

Further reading
Gray, J. E. (1854). "Description of a New Genus and some New Species of Tortoises". Proceedings of the Zoological Society of London. 1852: 133–135. (Manouria, new genus, p. 133).

 
Turtle genera
Taxa named by John Edward Gray
Taxonomy articles created by Polbot